The Itha T. Krumme Memorial Arboretum (2 acres) is an arboretum located at West 25th and Stanton Lake Park Road, next to Stanton Lake Park, northwest of Falls City, Nebraska. It is open without charge during daylight hours.

The arboretum features 30 types of trees and 20 varieties of shrubs, grasses, and wildflowers. All are native to Nebraska. Trees include paw paw, shagbark hickory, and all Nebraska-native oak species.

See also
 List of botanical gardens in the United States

External links

Arboreta in Nebraska
Botanical gardens in Nebraska
Protected areas of Richardson County, Nebraska